Lake Martin, located in St. Martin Parish, is a wildlife preserve and one of Louisiana's swamplands. The swamplands are home to a few trails as well as many different kinds of animals such as herons, egrets, ibis, bullfrogs, cottonmouths, alligators, and coypu (nutria) rats. Despite its classification as a wildlife reserve, however, there have been minor problems with litter and vandalism.

Gallery

External links 
 Nature Conservancy page on Lake Martin/Cypress Island

Parks in Louisiana
Swamps of Louisiana